Horatio Gates (October 30, 1777  – April 11, 1834) was a Canadian businessman, office holder, justice of the peace, and politician. He was the third president of the Bank of Montreal, and served on the Legislative Council of Lower Canada

References
 
 

1777 births
1834 deaths
Bank of Montreal presidents
Canadian Presbyterians
Pre-Confederation Canadian businesspeople
People from Barre, Massachusetts
Members of the Legislative Council of Lower Canada
Canadian justices of the peace
Anglophone Quebec people
American emigrants to pre-Confederation Quebec
Burials at Mount Royal Cemetery